Peter Currie may refer to:

Peter Currie (businessman), American executive
Peter Currie (footballer), Scottish footballer